Artem Perevozchikov is a retired Ukrainian professional footballer who played as a midfielder.

Career
Artem Perevozchikov started his career in 1999 with Desna Chernihiv, the main club in the city of Chernihiv, in Ukrainian Second League where he played 11 matches and with the club finished 9th in the league. In January 2003 he moved to Sokil Zolochiv where he played 1 match. In summer 2003 he moved back to Desna Chernihiv where he won the 2005–06 Ukrainian Second League. He also played 9 matches with Spartak Sumy. In summer 2007 he moved to Hirnyk-Sport Horishni Plavni, where he played 2 matches in the 2007–08 Ukrainian Second League season. In 2012 he moved to Stroitel-Energy Repki where he played 4 matches and then he moved to Avanhard Koryukivka where he won the Chernihiv Oblast Football Championship. In 2015 he moved to Kobra-2000 Chernihiv where he played 8 matches and in 2016 he moved to FC Frunzivets Nizhyn scoring 4 goals and winning the Chernihiv Oblast Football Championship and the Chernihiv Oblast Football Cup.

HonoursFrunzivets Nizhyn Chernihiv Oblast Football Championship: 2016
 Chernihiv Oblast Football Cup: 2016Avangard Korukivka Chernihiv Oblast Football Championship: 2012Desna Chernihiv'
 Ukrainian Second League: 2005–06

References

External links 
 Artem Perevozchikov at footballfacts.ru

1980 births
Living people
Footballers from Chernihiv
FC Desna Chernihiv players
FC Sokil Zolochiv players
FC Spartak Sumy players
FC Hirnyk-Sport Horishni Plavni players
FC Avanhard Koriukivka players
Ukrainian footballers
Ukrainian Premier League players
Ukrainian First League players
Ukrainian Second League players
Association football midfielders